North Carolina gained one representative as a result of the Census of 1810. Its elections were held April 30, 1813, after the term began but before Congress's first meeting.

See also 
 North Carolina's 3rd congressional district special election, 1813
 United States House of Representatives elections, 1812 and 1813
 List of United States representatives from North Carolina

Notes 

1813
North Carolina
United States House of Representatives